is an anime television film created for the Nippon Television Network's annual 24-hour charity program, Ai wa Chikyū o Suku, which roughly translates to "Love Saves the Earth".  The movie contained a veritable "Who's Who" of Tezuka's notable characters.  Each one had an important role, and many of them had individual, intertwining stories which would overlap with the ones of others.  To coincide with the central theme of the charity program, the movie emphasized on the dangers of environmental destruction, and that such disasters can be overcome by banding together.

For the previous charity special in 1978, Osamu Tezuka and Tezuka Productions created One Million-Year Trip: Bander Book.  The year after, when the special was held again in 1980, Tezuka and Tezuka Productions created another film, Fumoon, based on Tezuka's manga Nextworld.

Plot
The plot of Marine Express can be described in two parts. The first and longer part focuses on the people boarding the train and the problems they encounter on it. The second part takes place after the train has stopped at its half-way point, an island that used to be home to an ancient civilization millennia ago and has its fair share of secrets.

Trouble on the Train
The story takes place in the year 2002.

Construction has finished on an amazing piece of engineering and technology: the Marine Express. Traveling on a rail through large glass tunnels, the train is capable of taking passengers from Los Angeles, California to Japan. To celebrate its completion, a test-run has been arranged with many of the train's founders and family on board. The train was designed by Doctor Narzenkopf, whose oldest, and adopted, son, Rock, is the train's pilot. Also with Doctor Narzonkopf is his youngest son, Adam. Funding the train's construction is Director Credit, who is on the train with his daughter Milly.

In addition to the train's staff, others have boarded the train without permission. One of them is Shunsaku Ban, a detective on the trail of a criminal who he suspects is on board the train. Originally, he had been hired by the Chief Engineer of the Marine Express to investigate a possibility that someone was going to try and use the train for illicit means. Upon arriving at the engineer's home, Shunsaku was shocked to find his client murdered. Furthermore, the murderer hadn't left the premises yet, and when Shunsaku caught a glimpse of the culprit's face, he was shot. After recovering and seeing TV coverage of the train's test-run, Shunsaku now has reason to believe the man he's after is on the train.

In addition to Shunsaku, others who had boarded the train without position include Black Jack, a surgeon who treated Shunsaku Ban and has followed him onto the train in order to receive payment for his medical bill, and also Skunk Kusai, a criminal who intends to use the train as a means to smuggle illegal weapons and is the one responsible for murdering Shunsaku's client and shooting Shunsaku.

On the train, many disastrous situations arise forcing the passengers to work together to overcome their obstacles.

When Shunsaku Ban confronts Skunk, he and his cohorts fight back, forcing Shunsaku and a few other passengers to band together to keep the criminals from taking over the train. In the firefight, Doctor Narzenkopf is critically wounded, forcing Black Jack to do immediate brain surgery. However, Doctor Narzenkopf's son, Adam, is actually a robot designed to override the train's systems and explode the train when it reaches the Mariana Trench. The Doctor created Adam to do this because he feared what the Marine Express would do to the ocean ecology and couldn't stand to see its results.

Adam, however, has begun questioning his own existence, knowing that he is a robot, and designed for the sole reason of destroying the train. While in this mental quandary, he befriends the only other child on the train, Milly, daughter of the train's financial backer: Director Credit. Despite their budding friendship, Adam goes to the train's cockpit and takes over the computer systems, integrating them with his own. Overriding the system, Adam intends to force the train to crash, forcing the train to be shut down and preserving the ocean's ecosystems.

In a twist of fate, Adam finds that he is not the only robot on board, Milly is actually a robot as well. Through her kind words and persuasion, she convinces Adam to relinquish control of the train, allowing it and its passengers to reach their destination safely, an island designated as a half-way point and rest stop for the passengers of the train.

The Ancient Civilization of Mu
Arriving at the island, the surviving passengers disembark to get some rest. Shortly after getting off the train, however, does Rock see a glimpse of a beautiful woman before him. Suddenly, the Marine Express and all of its passengers are transported 30,000 years in the past.

Confused as to where they are, they are approached by a vampire named Dondora. Taking them to his master, they are greeted by the wicked fiend that had displaced the Marine Express and its passengers: Sharaku. A fiendish sorcerer and master of technology, Sharaku intends to use the Marine Express and all technology on it for his own sinister purposes. As for the passengers, he intends them to become excellent slaves.

Before he can execute his fiendish scheme, the passengers are saved by a mysterious white lion that can somehow fly. Escaping from Sharaku, they follow the lion to where a beautiful woman is being held captive. Rock immediately recognizes her as the woman from his vision, and she explains the situation to the Marine Express passengers.

Before Sharaku, she was Empress Sapphire of the Mu Empire. The Mu Empire was a peaceful civilization until Sharaku appeared. He overthrew her, and seized control of the Empire for himself. Not satisfied with just the Mu Empire, Sharaku hopes to expand his reign of power to beyond the Mu civilization. With the Marine Express, he hopes to have total domination of time and space.

Rock swears to Sapphire that he will help her reclaim her kingdom and together with the other passengers, they devise a way to stop the sinister Sharaku. Once defeated, the passengers had to decide what to do next. They could either stay behind to try to help rebuild the Mu Empire or take the Marine Express back to the present. Some that stayed behind included Rock who was going to wed Sapphire and Black Jack who wanted to stay for a while and treat the injured. Only Shunsaku Ban returned to the present, people on an island say what happened was a dream and everyone died on the Marine Express. But a carving on a nearby rock proved the experience to be real.

Cast

Production

See also
Osamu Tezuka
List of Osamu Tezuka anime
Osamu Tezuka's Star System
Astro Boy
Black Jack
Don Dracula
Jungle Emperor Leo
Metropolis
Princess Knight
The Three-Eyed One
Astro Boy: Omega Factor
Mu

References

External links
 
 Undersea Super Train: Marine Express anime at TezukaOsamu@World 
 Undersea Super Train: Marine Express on the Big Cartoon Database

1979 anime films
Anime television films
Fantasy anime and manga
Crossover anime and manga
Films set in 2002
Films set in the 2000s
Osamu Tezuka anime
Osamu Tezuka characters
Rail transport films
Science fiction anime and manga
1979 television films
1979 films